Ferdinand John Burket (born January 9, 1933) is a retired Canadian football player who played for the  Montreal Alouettes and Saskatchewan Roughriders. He played college football at Southeastern Oklahoma State University.

References

Living people
1934 births
Players of American football from San Antonio
Players of Canadian football from San Antonio
American football halfbacks
American football fullbacks
American football punters
Canadian football running backs
Canadian football punters
American players of Canadian football
Southeastern Oklahoma State Savage Storm football players
Saskatchewan Roughriders players
Montreal Alouettes players